Ivan Quay Spencer (November 28, 1888 - August 17, 1970) was an American Pentecostal minister who founded Elim Bible Institute and the Elim Fellowship.

Two collections of his writings, Faith: Living the Crucified Life and Daily Seedings: A Devotional Classic for the Spirit-Filled Life, were published posthumously in 2008. He is also the subject of a 1974 biography by Marion Meloon.

References

Further reading 
 Marion Meloon (1974), Ivan Spencer: Willow in the Wind, Logos International. , 

American evangelicals
1888 births
1970 deaths